The 2012–13 North Superleague was the twelfth staging of the North Superleague, the highest tier of league competition in the North Region of the Scottish Junior Football Association. The season began on 4 August 2012. The winners of this competition gain direct entry to round one of the 2013–14 Scottish Cup.

Culter won the championship on 4 May 2013, the club's sixth Superleague title.

Member clubs for the 2012–13 season
Hermes were the reigning champions. North Division One winners Inverness City were ineligible for promotion to the Superleague on ground criteria. Division One runners-up Fraserburgh United replaced the relegated Sunnybank.

Deveronside, who finished third in Division One, defeated thirteenth placed Forres Thistle 7–1 in a play-off arranged to decide the final promotion/relegation spot.

League table

Results

References

External links
 North Region JFA

6
SJFA North Region Superleague seasons